The western square-tailed drongo (Dicrurus occidentalis) is a species of drongo found in western Africa, where it is distributed from Senegal to the portion of Nigeria west of the Niger River. Its preferred habitat is secondary forest and gallery forest.

The western square-tailed drongo was first described in 2018 based on a genetic and morphological study of African drongos. Its closest relative is Sharpe's drongo (Dicrurus sharpei), from which it diverged about 1.3 million years ago. It can be differentiated from Sharpe's drongo by the differing bill width and height, and can be differentiated from other west African drongo species by its dull purplish blue gloss. Despite these morphological differences, it was long overlooked by taxonomists as there has been less research on west African drongos than on drongos in other parts of Africa.

References 

western square-tailed drongo
Birds of West Africa
western square-tailed drongo